The Midlands Merit League, was a summer rugby league tournament in England held between 2006 and 2009. It was a feeder league to the Rugby League Conference and had a season that ran from April to August. In its last season of 2009, it was also known as the RL Merit League.

It was superseded by the Midlands Rugby League, Yorkshire & Humber Merit League and North West Merit League.

History

The league was founded as the Midlands Merit League in late 2005 to support the growth of rugby league in non-heartland areas. Originally intended as a stand-alone league, support from the Rugby Football League meant that it could be administered as part of the Rugby League Conference set-up. Interest quickly gathered with 13 teams showing an interest in participating in the inaugural season – 8 eventually participated. The first ever game took place on 8 April 2006 at All Saints Sports College, Sheffield, where the Sheffield Forgers beat the Chesterfield Spires by 58 points to 8.

The first cross-league fixture was played in June 2007 when Nottingham Outlaws Academy visited Northampton Casuals of the London League. They also played a return fixture in July.

The 2007 season saw the introduction of an informal under-15 league based on Merit League principles. In 2008 the junior competition featured under-14 and under-16 divisions.

The league was renamed Rugby League Merit League (RLML) for the 2008 season due to its increased geographical spread with teams from the North of England taking part. 2009 saw the largest ever entry, with over 30 teams split into two pools; "Yorkshire and Humber" and "North West" with the Midlands Rugby League becoming its own competition using merit league rules.

In 2010 the Yorkshire & Humber Merit League and North West Merit League became separate competitions.

Teams joining the Rugby League Conference

The league has also proved popular with clubs in the Rugby League Conference (RLC) providing players or teams to the Midlands Merit League.

2007 South Humber Rabbitohs
2008 East Riding and Sheffield Forgers
2009 Nottingham Outlaws A, Moorends-Thorne Marauders A (failed to start season), Parkside Hawks(called up after one game), Wigan Riversiders
2010 Barnsley, Chester Gladiators, Crewe & Nantwich Steamers, Mancunians RL, Victoria Rangers, Wigan Riversiders Eels

Past winners

Championship

Shield

North West pool

Yorkshire and the Humber pool

See also
 British rugby league system
 London League (rugby league)
 Midlands Rugby League
 Rugby League Conference

External links
 Midlands rugby league site
 Google map of Merit League teams
 Rugby League Conference official site

Rugby League Conference